Ficus gigantosyce is a species of tree in the family Moraceae. It is found in South America.

References

External links 
 Type specimen of Ficus gigantosyce at Smithsonian Institution, United States National Herbarium

gigantosyce
Trees of Colombia
Trees of Peru
Trees of Ecuador